A clapper bridge is an ancient form of bridge found on the moors of the English West Country (Bodmin Moor, Dartmoor and Exmoor) and in other upland areas of the United Kingdom including Snowdonia and Anglesey, Cumbria, Derbyshire, Yorkshire, Lancashire, and in northern Wester Ross
and north-west Sutherland in Scotland. It is formed by large flat slabs of stone, often granite or schist. These can be supported on stone piers across rivers, or rest on the banks of streams.

History
Although often credited with prehistoric origin, most were erected in medieval times, and some in later centuries. They are often situated close to a ford where carts could cross.

Examples
 
A fine example, the Postbridge Clapper Bridge (illustration, left), can be found at Postbridge, on Dartmoor. It was first recorded in 1380 and was built to facilitate the transportation of Dartmoor tin by pack horses to the stannary town of Tavistock.

Other surviving examples include the Tarr Steps over the River Barle in Exmoor, and Stara Bridge over the River Lynher in east Cornwall.

Some larger clapper bridges, such as at Dartmeet and Bellever, have collapsed – their slabs swept away by floods, or raided for building or wall construction - and have since been rebuilt. However, there are many other smaller examples in existence on Dartmoor and still in use, such as those at Teignhead Farm (close to Grey Wethers stone circles), Scorhill and across the Wallabrook stream.

While the term "clapper bridge" is typically associated with the United Kingdom, other "clapper-style" bridges exist throughout the world. One example is the Anping Bridge in China, being over two kilometres long and one in Louisburgh, Co Mayo in the Republic of Ireland.

Notes

References

Dartmoor
Exmoor
Beam bridges
Footbridges